The Franklin American Mortgage Championship was a golf tournament for professional female golfers that was part of the LPGA Tour. It was played annually between 2004 and 2006 at the Vanderbilt Legends Club, Iron Horse Course in Franklin, Tennessee.

The title sponsor was the Franklin American Mortgage Company, a residential mortgage company based in Franklin. Country music singers Vince Gill and Amy Grant served as hosts of the event.

Proceeds from the event benefited the Monroe Carrel, Jr. Children's Hospital at Vanderbilt University. 

The 2007 tournament had been scheduled for April 19 through April 22. LPGA Commissioner Carolyn Bivens announced the tournament when presenting the 2007 schedule to the public on November 16, 2006. However, less than two weeks later, on November 28, 2006, Franklin American CEO Dan Crockett announced that the company had declined to renew its contract, putting the tournament in jeopardy. Shortly thereafter, the LPGA removed the event from its 2007 schedule without official comment.

Winners

Tournament record

External links
LPGA official tournament microsite
Vanderbilt Legends Club

Former LPGA Tour events
Golf in Tennessee
Recurring sporting events established in 2004
Recurring sporting events disestablished in 2006
2004 establishments in Tennessee
2006 disestablishments in Tennessee
Franklin, Tennessee
History of women in Tennessee